This was the first edition of the tournament.

Altuğ Çelikbilek won the title after defeating Quentin Halys 6–2, 6–1 in the final.

Seeds

Draw

Finals

Top half

Bottom half

References

External links
Main draw
Qualifying draw

Porto Challenger - 1